Dimitar Georgiev Mitkov (born 27 January 2000) is a Bulgarian footballer who plays as a forward for Russian club Rubin Kazan on loan from Lokomotiv Sofia.

Career
Mitkov started his career in his local Spartak Varna, before moving to Ludogorets Razgrad. In 2015, he joined Botev Plovdiv Academy, before rejoining again Ludogorets after one season. Mitkov made his professional debut for the first team on 14 August 2020 in a league match against Slavia Sofia.

On 12 January 2021 he joined the fellow First League team CSKA 1948 on loan for the rest of the season.

On 16 February 2023, Mitkov moved to Rubin Kazan in the Russian First League on loan until the end of the season.

International career
Mitkov received his first call up for the Bulgaria U21 team in November 2020 for the 2021 European Under-21 Championship qualifying match against Estonia U21, but was recalled 2 days before the match due to positive COVID-19 test.

Career statistics

Club

References

External links
 

2000 births
Living people
Bulgarian footballers
Bulgaria under-21 international footballers
Bulgaria youth international footballers
Association football forwards
PFC Ludogorets Razgrad II players
PFC Ludogorets Razgrad players
FC CSKA 1948 Sofia players
FC Lokomotiv 1929 Sofia players
FC Rubin Kazan players
First Professional Football League (Bulgaria) players
Second Professional Football League (Bulgaria) players
Bulgarian expatriate footballers
Expatriate footballers in Russia
Bulgarian expatriate sportspeople in Russia